The Thing About Styx is a 1942 German comedy crime film directed by Karl Anton and starring Laura Solari, Viktor de Kowa and Margit Symo. It was based on the novel Rittmeister Styx by Georg Mühlen-Schulte.

Cast
Laura Solari as Julia Sander
Viktor de Kowa as Captain Styx
Margit Symo as Ariane
Will Dohm as Basilio
Curt Lucas as Jules Stone
Walter Steinbeck as Jacques Stone
Hans Leibelt as consul Sander
Harald Paulsen as Dr. Bonnett
Theodor Loos as Lenski
Franz Weber as Cyrill
Werner Scharf as Tschelebi
Franz Zimmermann as Dodley
Kurt Seifert as Eugene
Karl Meixner as messenger
Leo Peukert as Duchan
Hans Stiebner as host
Louis Ralph as packager
Wilhelm Bendow as administrator of the legation
Kurt Mikulski as opera doorman
Theodor Vogeler as accompanist #1
Friedrich Petermann as accompanist #2
Karl Jüstel
Angelo Ferrari
Franz Schafheitlin
Walter Bechmann

References

Bibliography
Rentschler, Eric. The Ministry of Illusion: Nazi Cinema and Its Afterlife. Harvard University Press, 1996.

External links

1940s crime comedy films
German crime comedy films
Films of Nazi Germany
Films directed by Karl Anton
Films based on German novels
Tobis Film films
German black-and-white films
1942 comedy films
1940s German-language films
1940s German films